Trogloguignotus concii is a species of beetle in the family Dytiscidae, the only species in the genus Trogloguignotus.

References

Dytiscidae